Lake Haven is a lakeside suburb near Wyong on the NSW Central Coast and is located about  north east of the Wyong CBD. There is a local shopping and commercial centre that serves the district, with schools and all normal community facilities being available. Rail connections are available in Wyong and at Warnervale, where there is a connection to the M1 (Sydney to Newcastle) freeway.

References

Suburbs of the Central Coast (New South Wales)